Susan Strome is a Distinguished Professor of Molecular, Cell, and Developmental Biology at the University of California Santa Cruz.  Strome received a B.A. degree in Chemistry from University of New Mexico and a Ph.D. in Biochemistry from the University of Washington, as well as post-graduate work at the University of Colorado Boulder. Strome is a member of the American Academy of Arts and Sciences and the National Academy of Sciences.

Strome received a Guggenheim Fellowship in 1998.

Research 
Strome's work in developmental genetics investigates how germ cells are established and maintain identity, immortality, and potency from parent to offspring. Her research uses Caenorhabditis elegans, a worm, as a model system.

Selected publications

References

Living people
Year of birth missing (living people)
Place of birth missing (living people)
University of California, Santa Cruz faculty
American women geneticists
University of Washington alumni
University of New Mexico alumni
Members of the United States National Academy of Sciences
Fellows of the American Academy of Arts and Sciences
American geneticists
20th-century American biologists
20th-century American women scientists
21st-century American biologists
21st-century American women scientists